Mike Pawlawski (born July 18, 1969) is a former professional football player, a quarterback in the National Football League, Arena Football League, and XFL.

Born in Los Angeles, Pawlawski played college football at the University of California and led the Golden Bears to a 10–2 record and a #8 national ranking in 1991. He was selected by the Tampa Bay Buccaneers in the eighth round of the 1992 NFL Draft, playing one season for the team.
After spending 1993 and 1994 out of football, Pawlawski signed with the Arena Football League, playing his inaugural season with the Miami Hooters, then the next five with the Albany Firebirds where he established several league records and won Arena Bowl XIII Pawlawski finished his career with the San Francisco Demons of the XFL, where he led his team to an appearance in the league championship. He was one of only three quarterbacks (Tommy Maddox and Jim Druckenmiller being the other two) to last the whole XFL season without being injured or losing their job. It was later revealed, however, that Pawlawski had played the season with a fractured vertebra in his neck. It ended his football career.

He is currently the host of Gridiron Outdoors on Outdoor Channel and is a radio color commentator for Cal football on KGO 810 and the Cal radio network.

References

External links
Outdoor Channel: Mike Pawlawski
San Francisco Demons bio
Grid Iron Outdoors: Mike Pawlawski

1969 births
Living people
Albany Firebirds players
American football quarterbacks
Arena football announcers
California Golden Bears football announcers
California Golden Bears football players
Miami Hooters players
Players of American football from Los Angeles
San Francisco Demons players
Tampa Bay Buccaneers players
Shreveport Pirates players
Sportspeople from Los Angeles